Jacob Niclas Ahlström (5 June 1805 in Visby, Gotland – 14 May 1857 in Stockholm) was a Swedish Kapellmeister and composer.

Beginning his studies at Uppsala University in 1824, Ahlström dropped out due to lack of money and joined a touring theatrical troupe. From 1832 to 1842, he served as a cathedral organist and music teacher in Västerås and then became a Court Kapellmeister and organist in Stockholm until his death. In 1845, he held a concert in Berlin, during which he played Swedish folk songs and dances. During the years 1842 to 1854 Ahlström worked at the Nya theater in Stockholm where he wrote music in various genres for more than one hundred theatrical works.

Ahlström composed two operas based on libretti by Frans Hedberg, incidental music (for plays such as Agne, Positivhalaren, Ringaren i Notre Dame, and  Hinko och Urdur), a vocal symphony, chamber music, and lieder. Together with Per Conrad Boman, he published Svenska folksånger, folkdanser och folklekar, the best-known collection of Swedish folk songs which appeared during the 19th century. In 1852, he also published the Musikalisk fickordbok (Musical Pocket Book), which enjoyed several reissues.

References

Ahlström, Jacob Niklas from Nordisk familjebok (in Swedish).

1805 births
1857 deaths
19th-century classical composers
19th-century Swedish people
Swedish opera composers
Male opera composers
People from Gotland
Romantic composers
Swedish classical composers
Swedish male classical composers
Swedish classical organists
Male classical organists
Swedish conductors (music)
Male conductors (music)
19th-century conductors (music)
19th-century organists